Chlorine acid can refer to:

 Hydrochloric acid, HCl
 Hypochlorous acid, HClO
 Chlorous acid, HClO2
 Chloric acid, HClO3
 Perchloric acid, HClO4

Gallery